Welin is a surname that may refer to:

Anna Welin (born 1994), Swedish footballer
Axel Welin (1862–1951), Swedish inventor
Welin breech block, design for locking artillery breeches invented by Axel Welin
Gustaf Welin (1930–2008), Swedish Army lieutenant general 
Johanna Welin (born 1984), Swedish-born German wheelchair basketball player
Karl-Erik Welin (1934–1992), Swedish pianist and composer

See also 
 Welin (village), Walloon name of the village/municipality of Wellin, Belgium